Richland Collegiate High School (RCHS) of Mathematics, Science, and Engineering is a charter high school opened in 2006 at Dallas College in Dallas, Texas.

Students can complete their last two years of high school at Dallas College, Richland Campus, taking college courses and earning college credits with a focus on mathematics, science, or engineering. RCHS students can graduate from Dallas College with an Associate of Arts or Associate of Science degree and a high school diploma, ready to transfer or enter as a freshman to a four-year university.

In the fall semester of 2010, the Richland Collegiate High School of Visual, Performing, and Digital Arts opened.

References

External links 

 Dallas College Website
 Richland Collegiate High School Website

Public high schools in Dallas
Charter high schools in Texas
University-affiliated schools in the United States
Dallas College